Laura Gorgerino (born 31 March 1957) is an Italian former swimmer. She competed in the women's 4 × 100 metre freestyle relay at the 1972 Summer Olympics.

References

External links
 

1957 births
Living people
Olympic swimmers of Italy
Swimmers at the 1972 Summer Olympics
Swimmers from Rome
Italian female freestyle swimmers